NUCB Business School is a private  graduate business school in Japan. The school was established in 1990 by the Kurimoto Educational Institute. The school offers an Executive MBA program, an MBA program, M.Sc. programs, a Master of Management program, and executive education programs.

Overview

Mission 

The school’s mission is to educate innovative and ethical leaders who possess a ʻfrontier spiritʼ and to create knowledge that advances business and society, and to give students the ability to bridge the gap between New Asia and the rest of the world.

History 

NUCB Business School was established in 1990 and launched graduate-level degree programs to develop skilled and innovative business managers. In 2003, the school launched the first Executive MBA program in Japan.

 1990 - NUCB Business School founded to provide graduate-level management education
 2000 - One-year evening MBA program in Information Technology Management launched 
 2003 - Two-year Executive MBA launched
 2004 - Two-year M.Sc. in taxation launched
 2005 - Tokyo campus opened 
 2005 - Two-year Master in Management (English-track) launched 
 2005 - Center for Strategic Management established
 2006 - The school becomes the second institution in Japan to be accredited by Association to Advance Collegiate Schools of Business International
 2007 - Osaka campus opened
 2009 - The school becomes the first institution in Japan to be accredited by the Association of MBAs
 2009 - Membership of Association of Asia-Pacific Business Schools
 2011 - Non-degree executive education launched
 2011 - Membership of Principle for Responsible Management Education
 2011 - Asia Pacific Case Center established
 2012 - Membership of Executive MBA Council
 2013 - International Advisory Board established 
 2013 - Two-year MBA in entrepreneurship launched
 2015 - Nagoya Marunouchi campus opened
 2015 - Center for Family Business established
 2017 - Healthcare MBA track established
 2018 - Center for Case Method established
 2018 - Hosted the Case Method Seminar by Harvard Business Publishing
 2019 - Case Center Japan established
 2019 - Women's Leadership Program established
 2020 - The Certificate in Leadership Development (CLD) established as a leadership development program with courses in areas such as healthcare, digital transformation, entrepreneurial initiatives, and executive management.
 2021 - The school becomes the first institution in Japan to be a triple-accredited (AACSB, AMBA, EQUIS) school

International Accreditation 

 Association to Advance Collegiate Schools of Business AACSB
 Association of MBAs AMBA
 European Quality Improvement System EQUIS

International Memberships 

 Association of Asia-Pacific Business Schools
 European Foundation for Management Development
 Executive MBA Council
 Principles for Responsible Management Education

Local Accreditation 

 Japan Institution of Higher Education Evaluation

NUCB Business School offers a Ministry of Education, Culture, Sports, Science and Technology BP Accredited part-time Executive MBA program, a part-time MBA in innovation and entrepreneurship, and a part-time MSc in taxation as well as a full-time and a part-time Masters in Management program.

Rankings 

 Financial Times ranking 2018

 QS ranking 2021

Campus 
The school expanded into Tokyo in 2005 and then in Osaka in 2007. The Tokyo Marunouchi campus is located one minute away from the Japan Railways Tokyo Station. The Osaka satellite campus originally occupied space in Umeda but was later moved to the Grand Front Osaka in Umekita which is also one minute away from the city's major Japan Railways train station. Both satellite campuses were chosen for their location in commercial and finance districts and their proximity to major train stations.

Nagoya Marunouchi
Tokyo Marunouchi
Osaka Umekita

Academic programs

Degree Education 

 Executive MBA
 Master of Business Administration
 Master of Business Administration (English)
 Master of Science in Management (English)
 Master of Science in Accounting & Taxation

Executive Education 

 MBA Essentials
 Pre-MBA (certificate)

Exchange Program

The school offers an English-taught exchange program and double degree program. Involving over fifty different business courses from full-time faculty as well as visiting professors from its partner schools, the program utilizes the case method to facilitate exchange between diverse student backgrounds and perspectives. Exchange students can enroll for programs as short as two months within the five-term academic year schedule. This is designed to allow students on an exchange program to not only study, but also travel across Japan for a well-rounded study abroad experience. The double degree program requires that students spend one year at the school and one year at one of their 120+ partner schools.

Exchange and Double Degree Partners
As of 2021, the school had standing academic and student exchange agreements with 125 global partner institutions for post-graduate faculty exchange and student exchange. Schools with an asterisk (*) denote listed double degree partners.

Research centers 

 Center for Entrepreneurship
 Center for Family Business
 Center for Case Method
 Center for Strategic Management

Institutional partners

NUCB Business School has international exchanges with 125 partner business schools from 53 countries around the world including University of Alberta in Canada, Audencia Business School in France and Sasin Graduate Institute of Business Administration of Chulalongkorn University in Thailand. The Graduate School also facilitates a study abroad program for executive-level students at Harvard Business School, MIT Sloan School of Management and IMD Business School.

References

Official Site 

 NUCB Business School - EN 
 NUCB Business School - JP

Business schools in Japan
Postgraduate schools
Educational institutions established in 1990
1990 establishments in Japan